Destination Tennis is a television series hosted by Mayleen Ramey and Mieke Buchan who travel to different tennis courts around the world. Places visited include Las Vegas, Nevada, Palm Springs, California, and Australia. The series airs on the Tennis Channel.

External links

2006 American television series debuts
2010s American television series
American sports television series
English-language television shows